The Court Hotel is a historic hotel in Perth, Western Australia, located at the corner of Beaufort Street and James Street. It was built in 1888 and has been continually used as a hotel since then. It has been a gay and lesbian venue since the early 1990s.

History
The Court Hotel was constructed in 1888 in the Victorian Regency architectural style, and later renovated to include Federation Free Classical style and, mostly internally, the Inter-War Art Deco style.

Extensive renovations were undertaken in 1938, 2007, 2012 and 2017.

References

External links
 

Historic hotels in Perth, Western Australia
Heritage places in Perth, Western Australia
1888 establishments in Australia
Beaufort Street, Perth
LGBT drinking establishments
Pubs in Western Australia